Erdan (also Romanized as Erdān and Ardān; also known as Ardun) is a village in Dehshir Rural District, in the Central District of Taft County, Yazd Province, Iran. At the 2006 census, its population was 66, in 31 families.

References 

Populated places in Taft County